Ross Edwards (born 1 December 1942) is a former Australian cricketer. Edwards played in 20 Test matches for Australia, playing against England, West Indies and Pakistan. He also played in nine One Day Internationals including the 1975 Cricket World Cup. He was a right-handed batsman and superb cover fielder as well as a part-time wicket-keeper.

Edwards was born in December 1942 in Cottesloe, Western Australia. His father, Edmund Edwards, played twice for Western Australia as a wicket-keeper.

In the 1971–72 Sheffield Shield season he made four centuries and went to England in 1972 at the age of 29 and got his first chance at Nottingham where he made an unbeaten 170.  He made ducks in his next two innings however.

In 1974–75 Edwards scored his second century against England when he hit 115 in the Perth Test match. He made 99 at Lord's in 1975.

References

External links

1942 births
Living people
Australia One Day International cricketers
Australia Test cricketers
Cricketers at the 1975 Cricket World Cup
New South Wales cricketers
Western Australia cricketers
World Series Cricket players
Cricketers from Perth, Western Australia
Australian cricketers
Sportsmen from Western Australia